Boas Atururi (born 21 August 1990) is an Indonesian professional footballer who plays as a left-back.

Club career

Semen Padang
In 2019, Boas Atururi signed a one-year contract with Indonesian Liga 1 club Semen Padang.

Persewar Waropen
Atururi joined the Persewar Waropen club in the 2020 Liga 2. This season was suspended on 27 March 2020 due to the COVID-19 pandemic. The season was abandoned and was declared void on 20 January 2021.

References

External links
 Boas Atururi at Soccerway
 Boas Atururi at Liga Indonesia

1990 births
Living people
Indonesian footballers
Persewar Waropen players
Perseru Serui players
Badak Lampung F.C. players
Semen Padang F.C. players
Persipura Jayapura players
Liga 1 (Indonesia) players
Liga 2 (Indonesia) players
People from Yapen Islands Regency
Association football defenders
Sportspeople from Papua
21st-century Indonesian people